"The Woodpecker Song" (Reginella Campagnola) is originally an Italian song. The music was written by Eldo Di Lazzaro in 1939, while the Italian lyrics were written by Bruno Cherubini (pseudonym "C. Bruno"). The English lyrics were written by Harold Adamson. The song became a hit in 1940, recorded by Glenn Miller and His Orchestra, The Andrews Sisters, and Kate Smith in 1940.

The Glenn Miller recording on RCA Bluebird featuring Marion Hutton on vocals reached No. 1 on the Billboard charts in 1940.

Recorded versions 

 Glenn Miller & His Orchestra. Vocalist: Marion Hutton. Recorded on January 29, 1940. Released on a 78 rpm A side single record by Bluebird Records as catalog number 10598 backed with "Let's All Sing Together".  It "ranked third in jukeboxes in 1940."
 The Andrews Sisters. Recorded on February 21, 1940. Released on a 78 rpm record by Decca Records as catalog number 3065A.
 Kate Smith with Jack Miller Orchestra. Recorded on February 25, 1940. Released on a 78 rpm record by Columbia Records as catalog number 35398.
 Josephine Siao (蕭芳芳). Recorded in Cantonese under the title of "Swallow Flying In Pair" (燕雙飛) in 1967 and released by Fung Hang Record (風行唱片) of Hong Kong under catalog number FHEP400 as one of the theme songs of Cantonese movie You Are My Love (我的愛人就是你).
 Two Greek versions were released in 1940 with different titles and lyrics. The first one was Μικρη χωριατοπουλα (Little Country Girl) recorded by Rena Vlahopoulou and also by Photis Polymeris with lyrics by Paul Menestrel.The second one "Κοροιδο Μουσσολινι" was a satirical version for the Italian dictator Benito Mussolini with lyrics by Yiorgos Economidis, who also recorded the song.
 Hungarian version title: Egy kis kíváncsi kacsa, sung by László Kazal and Ida Major (1945) Lyrics János Rákosi
 French version Title: Reginella by Tino Rossi (1939) Lysics Louis Poterat

On Film 

 Gene Autry and Mary Lee - "The Woodpecker Song" from Ride, Tenderfoot, Ride (Republic Pictures, September 6, 1940)

References 

1940 songs
Glenn Miller songs
Kate Smith songs
Songs with lyrics by Harold Adamson
Songs about birds
Bluebird Records singles
Gracie Fields songs